The role of an Australia national football team manager was first established in 1965 with the appointment of Tiko Jelisavčić. Before this, the Australia team was selected by a committee, a process in which Australia would select coaches and trainers to prepare the side for single games.

Twenty men have occupied the post since its inception; five of those were in short-term caretaker manager roles.

History

Full-time era begins (1965–1969)
Before 1965, the Australia national soccer team had been under the leadership of a selection committee and a trainer. Appointed in 1965, Tiko Jelisavčić had been the first Australia manager. In his first game as manager, he led Australia to a 1–6 loss against North Korea at Stade Olympique, Phnom Penh in the 1966 FIFA World Cup qualification. with Australia failing to qualify for the World Cup finals.

Czech Jozef Vengloš was appointed in 1967 when he managed three games all against Scotland, losing all three games. The rest of the matches played in 1967, were managed by Hungarian manager Joe Vlatsis, where he managed 23 games, winning thirteen, drawing seven and losing three. Vlatsis also failed to qualify for the 1970 FIFA World Cup after losing to Israel in the Final Round of the qualification zone.

Rasic in World Cup (1969–1978)
Rale Rasic was appointed as head coach in 1970 at just 34 years of age, and in 1974. After three failed attempts, he led Australia to the 1974 World Cup as coach. After the World Cup, the Australian Soccer Federation sacked Rasic, replacing him with Englishman Brian Green. Rasic and others believe that he was dumped because he was not seen as being a real "Aussie." He has stated, "They took from me something that I was doing better than anyone else. I was a true-blue Aussie and nobody can deny that. I taught the players how to sing the national anthem."

Green was later coach for Australia in 1975 and 1976., with him winning two, drawing three and losing three. At the end of 1976, Jim Shoulder went on to coach Australia in the 1978 FIFA World Cup qualification from 1976 to 1978. After failing to secure Australia's qualification to the 1978 World Cup in Argentina, Shoulder was sacked, and replaced by German Rudi Gutendorf.

Nations Cup success (1978–1989)

Rudi Gutendorf was appointed in mid-1979, where his first game managed was against New Zealand which Australia lost for the first time in 25 years. At the start of 1980, he managed three games against Czechoslovakia which had the opposition manager as former Australia manager, Jozef Venglos. This was also a time where Australia entered their first Oceania Nations Cup, which was won in the Final against non-FIFA affiliated team Tahiti winning 4–2. Gutendorf had only managed the First Round of the 1982 World Cup qualification, both against New Zealand.

Former player Les Scheinflug managed the rest of the 1982 World Cup qualification and manage Australia for two more years, as Australia once again failed to qualify. As Scheinflug went on to manage the Australia U20s in 1983, Frank Arok was appointed for Australia managing from 1983 to 1989. where he managed his first game against England which resulted in a 0–0 draw. Arok also managed the 1986 World Cup qualification, which was failed again at the final round.

Statistical summary
The following table provides a summary of the complete record of each Australia manager including their progress in both the World Cup, Asian Cup and OFC Nations Cup.

Statistics correct as of 30 December 2022

Coaches in Italics were hired as caretakers

Coaches by nationality

References
General
 

Specific

External links
 Australian Managers

 
Australia